Events from the year 1808 in Ireland.

Events
 2 February – Daniel Delany, Bishop of Kildare and Leighlin, founds the Patrician Brothers.
 15 February – laying of the foundation stone for Nelson's Pillar in Dublin
 6 June – the Bank of Ireland moves its premises to the former Irish Houses of Parliament on College Green, Dublin.
 12 July – Lieutenant-General Sir Arthur Wellesley embarks troops at Cork to join the Peninsular War in Portugal.
 15 August – seven men, including Edmund Rice, take religious promises under John Power, Bishop of Waterford and Lismore, as the Presentation Brothers.
 22 August – the Roman Catholic Cathedral of St Mary and St Anne in Cork is dedicated.

Arts and literature
Mary Leadbeater's Poems published.
Rev. Charles Maturin's novel The Wild Irish Boy published under the pseudonym Dennis Jasper Murphy.
Thomas Moore's A Selection of Irish Melodies (first two volumes) published.

Births
15 May – Michael William Balfe, composer (died 1870).
Anne Elizabeth Ball, phycologist (died 1872).
Joseph Francis Olliffe, physician (died 1869).

Deaths
10 February – Hugh Douglas Hamilton, artist (b. c1734).
30 September – Peter Russell, gambler, government official, politician and judge in Upper Canada (born 1733).

References

 
1800s in Ireland
Ireland
Years of the 19th century in Ireland